The 2019 TCR China season was the third season of the TCR's Chinese Touring Car Championship.

Teams and drivers

Calendar and results

Championship standings

Drivers' championship 

Scoring systems

Team's Standings

References

External links 

 TCR China Series Official website

TCR China Series
China Touring Car Championship